Steel Design, or more specifically, Structural Steel Design, is an area of structural engineering used to design steel structures. These structures include schools, houses, bridges, commercial centers, tall buildings, warehouses, aircraft, ships and stadiums. The design and use of steel frames are commonly employed in the design of steel structures. More advanced structures include steel plates and shells.

In structural engineering, a structure is a body or combination of pieces of the rigid bodies in space that form a fitness system for supporting loads and resisting moments. The effects of loads and moments on structures are determined through structural analysis. A steel structure is composed of structural members that are made of steel, usually with standard cross-sectional profiles and standards of chemical composition and mechanical properties. The depth of steel beams used in the construction of bridges is usually governed by the maximum moment, and the cross-section is then verified for shear strength near supports and lateral torsional buckling (by determining the distance between transverse members connecting adjacent beams). Steel column members must be verified as adequate to prevent buckling after axial and moment requirements are met.

There are currently two common methods of steel design:  The first method is the Allowable Strength Design (ASD) method.  The second is the Load and Resistance Factor Design (LRFD) method. Both use a strength, or ultimate level design approach.

Load combination equations

Allowable Strength Design

For ASD, the required strength, Ra, is determined from the following load combinations (according to the AISC SCM, 13 ed.) and:

D + F
D + H + F + L + T
D + H + F + (Lr or S or R)
D + H + F + 0.75(L + T) + 0.75(Lr or S or R)
D + H + F ± (0.6W or 0.7E)
D + H + F + (0.75W or 0.7E) + 0.75L + 0.75(Lr or S or R)
0.6D + 0.6W
0.6D ± 0.7E

where:
 D = dead load,
 Di = weight of Ice,
 E = earthquake load,
 F = load due to fluids with well-defined pressures and maximum heights,
 Fa = flood load,
 H = load due to lateral earth pressure, ground water pressure, or pressure of bulk materials,
 L = live load due to occupancy,
 Lr = roof live load,
 S = snow load,
 R = nominal load due to initial rainwater or ice, exclusive of the ponding contribution,
 T = self straining load,
 W = wind load,
 Wi = wind on ice..

Special Provisions exist for accounting flood loads and atmospheric loads i.e. Di and Wi

Note that Allowable Strength Design is NOT equivalent to Allowable Stress Design, as governed by AISC 9th Edition. Allowable Strength Design still uses a strength, or ultimate level, design approach.

Load and Resistance Factor Design
For LRFD, the required strength, Ru, is determined from the following factored load combinations:

1.4(D + F)
1.2(D + F + T) + 1.6(L + H) + 0.5(Lr or S or R)
1.2D + 1.6(Lr or S or R) + (L or 0.8W)
1.2D + 1.0W + L + 0.5(Lr or S or R)
1.2D ± 1.0E + L + 0.2S + 0.9D + 1.6W + 1.6H
0.9D + 1.6 H ± (1.6W or 1.0E)

where the letters for the loads are the same as for ASD.

For the wind consideration, the ASCE allows a "position correction factor" which turns the coefficient of wind action to 1.36:

1.2D + 1.36W + .... the same above
or
0.9D - 1.36W
1.8(D+F)

AISC Steel Construction Manual
The American Institute of Steel Construction (AISC), Inc. publishes the Steel Construction Manual (Steel construction manual, or SCM), which is currently in its 15th edition. Structural engineers use this manual in analyzing, and designing various steel structures. Some of the chapters of the book are as follows.

Dimensions and properties of various types of steel sections available on the market (W, S, C, WT, HSS, etc.)
General Design Considerations
Design of Flexural Members 
Design of Compression Members
Design of Tension members
Design of Members Subject to Combined Loading
Design Consideration for Bolts
Design Considerations for Welds
Design of Connecting Elements
Design of Simple Shear Connections
Design of Flexure Moment Connections
Design of Fully Restrained (FR) Moment Connections
Design of Bracing Connections and Truss Connections
Design of Beam Bearing Plates, Column Base Plates, Anchor Rods, and Column Splices
Design of Hanger Connections, Bracket Plates, and Crane-Rail Connections
General Nomenclature
Specification and Commentary for Structural Steel Buildings 
RCSC Specification and Commentary for Structural Joints Using High-Strength Bolts
Code of Standard Practice and Commentary for Structural Steel Buildings and Bridges
Miscellaneous Data and Mathematical Information

CISC Handbook of Steel Construction
Canadian Institute of Steel Construction publishes the "CISC Handbook of steel Construction". CISC is a national industry organization representing the structural steel, open-web steel joist and steel plate fabrication industries in Canada. It serves the same purpose as the AISC manual, but conforms with Canadian standards.

See also 
 Structural steel

References

Structural engineering
Structural steel